Alfred Flury (or Fleury, born November 23, 1914, date of death unknown), also known as Fred Flury, was a Swiss boxer who competed in the 1936 Summer Olympics. In 1936 he was eliminated in the first round of the middleweight class after losing his fight to Adolf Baumgarten.

1936 Olympic results
 Round of 32: lost to Adolf Baumgarten (Germany) by decision

External links
Alfred Flury's profile at Sports Reference.com
Alfred Flury's profile at Boxrec.com

1914 births
Year of death missing
Middleweight boxers
Olympic boxers of Switzerland
Boxers at the 1936 Summer Olympics
Swiss male boxers